The 1965 Munster Senior Club Hurling Championship was the second staging of the Munster Senior Club Hurling Championship since its establishment by the Munster Council. The championship, which was open to the champion clubs of 1965, began on 15 May 1966 and ended on 14 May 1967.

On 14 May 1967, St. Finbarr's won the championship after a 3-12 to 2-03 defeat of Mount Sion in the final at the Gaelic Grounds. It was their first ever championship title.

Tony Connolly from the St. Finbarr's club was the championship's top scorer with 4-05.

Results

First round

Semi-finals

Final

Championship statistics

Top scorers

Top scorer overall

Top scorers in a single game

References

1965 in hurling
Munster Senior Club Hurling Championship